William Hutt may refer to:

 Sir William Hutt (politician) (1801–1882), British politician
 William Harold Hutt (1899–1988), British economist
 William Hutt (actor) (1920–2007) Canadian actor